The Parliamentary Under-Secretary of State for Foreign Affairs is a vacant junior position in the British government, subordinate to both the Secretary of State for Foreign Affairs and since 1945 also to the Minister of State for Foreign Affairs. The post is based at the Foreign, Commonwealth and Development Office, which was created by the merger of the Foreign Office, where the position was initially based, with the Commonwealth Office in 1968 and the Department for International Development in 2020. Notable holders of the office include Granville Leveson-Gower, 2nd Earl Granville, John Wodehouse, 1st Earl of Kimberley, Edward Grey, 1st Viscount Grey of Fallodon, George Curzon, 1st Marquess Curzon of Kedleston, and Anthony Eden.

List of ministers

See also 

Foreign, Commonwealth and Development Office
Foreign Secretary
Minister of State for Europe
Minister of State for Foreign Affairs
Minister of State for Middle East and North Africa
Under-Secretary of State for the Home Department
Undersecretary

References

Foreign, Commonwealth and Development Office
Foreign Affairs, Under-Secretary of State
1782 establishments in Great Britain
Foreign Affairs, Under-Secretary of State